Murari is a 2015 Indian Kannada-language action drama film directed by H. Vasu and starring Sriimurali and Rashmi Jadhav.

Cast 
Sriimurali
Rashmi Jadhav
Sharath Lohitashwa
Prasanna 
Sathish Ninasam

Production and release 
The film was launched in 2008 but did not release for unknown reasons. After Sriimurali found success with Ugramm (2014) after consecutive flops, the makers decided to release the film to cash in on the film's success. The film was initially scheduled to release on 25 July 2014. The film was later scheduled to release on 1 May 2015 before being postponed to 22 May 2015.

Reception 
A critic from Bangalore Mirror wrote that "Overall Murari is not the worst film of Sri Murali but it has absolutely nothing special". A critic from The Times of India opined that the film has "A hackneyed plot that has come a few years too late".

References